Nastaliq, also romanized as Nastaʿlīq or Nastaleeq is one of the main calligraphic hands used to write the Perso-Arabic script in the Persian and Urdu languages, often used also for Ottoman Turkish poetry, rarely for Arabic. Nastaliq developed in Iran from naskh beginning in the 13th century and remains very widely used in Iran, Pakistan and Afghanistan. It is also used in India as a minority script and other countries for written poetry and as a form of art.

History 
The name nastaliq "is a contraction of the Persian , meaning a hanging or suspended naskh". That tradition was questioned by Elaine Wright, who traced evolution of nastaliq in 14th century Iran and showed how it developed gradually among scribes in Shiraz. Moreover, according to her studies nastaliq has its origin not in combining naskh and taliq, as was commonly thought, but from naskh alone. In addition to study of the practice of calligraphy Elaine Wright also found a document written by Jafar Tabrizi c. 1430, according to whom:

Thus "our earliest written source also credits Shirazi scribes with the development of nastaʿliq and Mir ʿAli Tabrizi with its canonization". The picture of origin of nastaliq presented by Elaine Wright was further complicated by studies of Francis Richard, who on the basis of some manuscripts from Tabriz argued that its early evolution wasn't confined to Shiraz. Finally, many authors point out that development of nastaʿliq was a process which takes few centuries. For example, Gholam-Hosayn Yusofi, Ali Alparslan and Sheila Blair recognize gradual shift towards nastaliq in some 13th century manuscripts. Hamid Reza Afsari traces first elements of the style in 11th-century copies of Persian translations of the Qur'an.

Persian differs from Arabic in its proportion of straight and curved letters. It also lacks the definite article al-, whose upright alif and lam are responsible for distinct verticality and rhythm of the text written in Arabic. Hanging scripts like taliq and nastaliq were particularly suitable for writing Persian - when taliq was used for court documents, nastaliq was developed for Persian poetry, "whose hemistiches encourage the pile-up of letters against the intercolumnar ruling. Only later was it adopted for prose".

The first master of nastaliq was aforementioned Mir Ali Tabrizi, who passed his style to his son ʿUbaydallah. The student of Ubaydallah, Jafar Tabrizi (d. 1431) (see quote above), moved to Herat, when he becomes the head of the scriptorium (kitabkhana) of prince Baysunghur (therefore his epithet Baysunghuri). Jafar trained several students in nastaliq, of whom the most famous was Azhar Tabrizi (d. 1475). Its classical form nastaliq achieved under Sultan Ali Mashhadi (d. 1520), a student of Azhar (or perhaps one of Azhar's students) who worked for Sultan Husayn Bayqara (1469 - 1506) and his vizier Ali-Shir Nava'i. At the same time different style of nastaliq developed in western and southern Iran. It was associated with ʿAbd al-Rahman Khwarazmi, the calligrapher of the Pir Budaq Qara Qoyunlu (1456-1466), and after him was followed by his children,  ʿAbd al-Karim Khwarazmi and ʿAbd al-Rahim Anisi (both active at the court of Ya'qub Beg Aq Qoyunlu) (1478 - 1490). This more angular western Iranian style was largely dominant at the beginning of the Safavid era, but then lost ground to the more fluid eastern style canonized by Sultan Ali Mashhadi - although it continued to be widely used in the Indian subcontinent.

The most famous calligrapher of the next generation in eastern lands was Mir Ali Heravi (d. 1544), who was master of nastaliq, especially renowned for his calligraphic specimens (qitʿa). The eastern style of nastaliq became the predominant style in western Iran, as artists gravitated to work in Safavid royal scriptorium. The most famous of these calligraphers working for court in Tabriz was Shah Mahmud Nishapuri (d. 1564/1565), known especially for unusual choice of nastaliq as script used for the copy of Qur'an. Its apogeum nastaliq achieved in writings of Mir Emad Hassani (d. 1615), "whose style was the model in the following centuries". Mir Emad's successors in the 17th and 18th centuries had developed a more elongated style of nastaliq, with wider spaces between words. Mirza Mohammad Reza Kalhor (d. 1892), the most important calligrapher of the 19th century, reintroduced the more compact style, writing words on a smaller scale in a single motion. In the 19th century nastaliq was also adopted in Iran for litographed books. In the 20th century "the use of nastaliq declined. After World War II, however, interest in calligraphy and above all in nastaliq revived, and some outstandingly able masters of the art have since then emerged".

The use of nastaliq very early expanded beyond Iran. Timurids brought it to India and nastaliq became favorite script at the Persian court of the Mughals. For Akbar (1556-1605) and Jahangir (1605-1627) worked such famous masters of nastaliq as Muhammad Husayn Kashmiri (d. 1611/1612) and Abd al-Rahim Anbarin-Qalam. Another important practitioner of the script was Abd al-Rashid Daylami (d. 1671), nephew and student of Mir Emad, who after his arrival in India became court calligrapher of Shah Jahan (1628-1658). During this era Nastaliq became the common script for writing in Urdu.

Nastaliq was also adopted in Ottoman Empire, which has always had strong cultural ties to Iran. Here it was known as taliq (Turkish talik), which shouldn't be confused with Persian taliq script. First Iranian calligraphers who brought nastaliq to Ottoman lands, like Asadullah Kirmani (d. 1488), belonged to the western tradition. But relatively early Ottoman calligraphers adopted eastern style of nastaliq. In 17th century student of Mir Emad, Darvish Abdi Bokharai (d. 1647), transplanted his style to Istanbul. The greatest master of nastaliq in 18th century was Mehmed Yasari (d. 1798), who closely followed Mir Emad. This tradition was further developed by son of Yasari, Mustafa Izzet (d. 1849), who was a real founder of distinct Ottoman school of nastaliq. He introduced new and precise proportions of the script, different than in Iranian tradition. The most important member of this school in the second half of the 19th century was Sami Efendi (d. 1912), who taught many famous practitioners of nastaliq, like Mehmed Nazif Bey (d. 1913), Mehmed Hulusi Yazgan (d. 1940) and Necmeddin Okyay (d. 1976). The specialty of Ottoman school was celî nastaliq used in inscriptions and mosque plates.

Nastaliq 

Its development is connected with the fact that "the increasing use of nastaʿlīq and consequent need to write it quickly exposed it to a process of gradual attrition". The shekasteh nastaliq emerged in the early 17th century and differed from proper nastaliq only in so far as some of the letters were shrunk (shekasta, lit. “broken”) and de­tached letters and words were sometimes joined. These unauthorized connections "mean that calligraphers can write shikasta faster than any other script". Manuscripts from this early period show signs of the influence of shekasteh taliq; while having the appearance of a shrunken form of nastaliq, they also contain features of taliq "due to their being written by scribes who had been trained in taʿlīq". Shekasteh nastaliq (usually shortened to simply skehasteh), being more easily legible than taliq gradually replaced the latter as the script of decrees and documents. Later it also came into use for writing prose and poetry.

The first important calligraphers of shekasteh were Mohammad Shafiʿ Heravi (d. 1670–71) (he was known as Shafiʿa and hence shekasteh was sometimes called shafiʿa or shifiʿa) and Mortazaqoli Khan Shamlu (d. 1688–89). Both of them produced works of real artistic quality, which doesn't change the fact that in this early phase shekasteh still lacked consistency (it is especially visible in writing of Mortazaqoli Khan Shamlu). Most modern scholars consider that shekasteh reached its peak of artistic perfection under Abdol Majid Taleqani (d. 1771), "who gave the script its distinctive and definite form". The tradition of Taleqani was later followed by Mirza Kuchek Esfahani (d. 1813), Gholam Reza Esfahani (d. 1886–87) and Ali Akbar Golestaneh (d. 1901).

The added frills made shekasteh increasingly difficult to read and it remained the script of documents and decrees, "while nastaʿliq retained its pre-eminence as the main calligraphic style". The need for simplification of shekasteh resulted in development of secretarial style (shekasteh-ye tahriri) by writers like Adib-al-Mamalek Farahani (d. 1917) and Nezam Garrusi (d. 1900). The secretarial style is a simplified form of shekasteh which is faster to write and read, but less artistic. Long used in governmental and other institutions in Iran shekasteh degenerated in the first half of the 20th century, but later again engaged the attention of calligraphers. Shekasteh was used only in Iran and to a small extent in Afghanistan and Ottoman Empire. Its use in Afghanistan was different from the Persian norm and sometimes only as experimental devices (tafannon)

Nastaliq typesetting 

 Typography first started with attempts to develop a metallic type for the script, but all such efforts failed. Basically, in order to develop such a metal type, thousands of pieces would be required.

Modern  typography began with the invention of Noori Nastaleeq which was first created as a digital font in 1981 through the collaboration of Ahmed Mirza Jamil (as calligrapher) and Monotype Imaging (formerly Monotype Corp & Monotype Typography). Although this was a ground-breaking solution employing over 20,000 ligatures (individually designed character combinations) which provided accurate results and allowed newspapers such as Pakistan's Daily Jang to use digital typesetting instead of an army of calligraphers, it suffered from two problems in the 1990s: (a) its non-availability on standard platforms such as Microsoft Windows or Mac OS, and (b) the non-WYSIWYG nature of text entry, whereby the document had to be created by commands in Monotype's proprietary page description language.

InPage 

In 1994, InPage Urdu, which is a fully functional page layout software for Windows akin to QuarkXPress, was developed for Pakistan's newspaper industry by an Indian software company Concept Software Pvt Ltd. It offered the Noori Nastaliq font licensed from Monotype Imaging. This font, with its vast ligature base of over 20,000, is still used in current versions of the software for Windows. As of 2009 InPage has become Unicode based, supporting more languages, and the Faiz Lahori Nastaliq font with Kasheeda has been added to it along with compatibility with OpenType Unicode fonts. Nastaliq Kashish has been made for the first time in the history of  Typography.

Cross platform Nastaliq fonts 

 Windows 8 was the first version of Microsoft Windows to have native Nastaliq support, through Microsoft's "Urdu Typesetting" font.
 

 Google has an open-source Nastaliq font called Noto Nastaliq Urdu. Apple provides this font on all Mac installations since macOS High Sierra. Likewise, Apple has carried this font on iOS devices since iOS 11.
 Awami Nastaliq features a more extensive character set than most Nastaliq typefaces, supporting:  Urdu, Balochi, Persian, Khowar, Palula, Saraiki, Shina.
 Amar Nastaleeq was created for web embedding on Urdu websites in 2013. The font was announced by Urdu poet Fahmida Riaz.

Letter forms 

For the Arabic alphabet, and many others derived from it, letters are regarded as having two or three general forms each, based on their position in the word (though obviously Arabic calligraphy can add a great deal of complexity). But the Nastaliq style uses more than three general forms for many letters, even in non-decorative documents. For example, most documents written in Urdu.

In Unicode
For Unicode, Nastaliq is considered to be merged into the Arabic script.

See also 
 Islamic calligraphy
 Persian calligraphy
 Shahmukhi script
 Urdu alphabet
 Ruqʿah script

References

Bibliography

External links 

 Rumicode: Online Service For  Calligraphy
 Nastaliq Online: Online Service For  Calligraphy
 Iranian Calligraphers Association
 Nastaliq Writer for Macintosh by SIL
 InPage Urdu: Official InPage Urdu DTP software site
 Faiz Nastaliq: Official Faiz  site
 Profiles and works of World Islamic calligraphy 
 Nastaliq Script | Persian Calligraphy
 Awami Nastaliq: A Nastaliq font by SIL International

Islamic calligraphy
Persian calligraphy
Persian orthography
Urdu calligraphy
Iranian inventions